ABCC can mean:
 Atomic Bomb Casualty Commission
 Angami Baptist Church Council
 Arunachal Baptist Church Council
 Australian Building and Construction Commission, an Australian Government agency (since 2016)
 Office of the Australian Building and Construction Commissioner, a former Australian Government agency that existed from 2005 to 2012
 The Association of British Chambers of Commerce, since 1996 known as the British Chambers of Commerce